Jeeva (21 September 1963 – 26 June 2007) was an Indian filmmaker, cinematographer and film director in Tamil, Hindi and Malayalam-language cinema. He was an established cinematographer in the late 90s and early 2000s.

Career
Jeeva started his career assisting cinematographer P. C. Sreeram in the films such as Nayakan, Agni Natchathiram, Apoorva Sagodharargal, Idhaya Thamarai, Gopura Vasalile and Meera. He became an independent cinematographer in Priyadarshan's Malayalam film Abhimanyu (1991) starring Mohanlal and went on to film over 20 films including his own directorials. He was director Shankar's usual cinematographer in his early films such as Gentleman (1993), Kadhalan (1994) and Indian (1996). Jeeva's work in Shankar's Kadhalan fetched him the Tamil Nadu State Film Award for Best Cinematographer. He had also collaborated several times with director Priyadarshan.

The four completed films he directed, namely 12B (2001), Run (Hindi version) (2004), Ullam Ketkumae (2005) and Unnale Unnale (2007), have become blockbusters (except for Run). He died after suffering acute cardiac arrest in Russia on 26 June 2007 at the age of 43. At the time of his death, he was busy with the final schedule of his latest film, Dhaam Dhoom (2008).

Personal life
Jeeva was married to costume designer Anees Tanveer with whom he has two children.

Death
Jeeva died in Saint Petersburg, Russia, following a cardiac arrest, while working on his movie Dhaam Dhoom.

Filmography
As director

As cinematographer

As Still Photographer 
 Bombay (1995)

References

External links
 
 

1963 births
2007 deaths
Tamil film directors
Film directors from Chennai
21st-century Indian film directors
Tamil film cinematographers
Cinematographers from Tamil Nadu
20th-century Indian photographers
21st-century Indian photographers